The 2015 Salford City Council election took place on 7 May 2015 to elect members of Salford City Council in England. This was the same day as other local elections, and the 2015 United Kingdom general election. The last time these seats were contested was in 2011.

The composition of the Council following the 2015 elections:

Wards
The electoral division results listed below are based on the changes from the 2014 elections, not taking into account any mid-term by-elections or party defections. Asterisks denote incumbent Councillors seeking re-election.

Barton ward

Boothstown & Ellenbrook ward

Broughton ward

Cadishead ward

Claremont ward

Eccles ward

Irlam ward

Irwell Riverside ward

Kersal ward

Langworthy ward

Little Hulton ward

Ordsall ward

Pendlebury ward

Swinton North ward

Swinton South ward
Councillor Neil Blower subsequently became an Independent in February 2016.

Walkden North ward

Walkden South ward

Weaste & Seedley ward

Winton ward

Worsley ward

References

2015 English local elections
May 2015 events in the United Kingdom
2015
2010s in Greater Manchester